The Shome Panel is responsible for constituting guidelines for General Anti Avoidance Rules (GAAR) in India. The panel was established by Dr. Manmohan Singh and headed by economist Parthasarathi Shome.

About 
The committee has said that the retrospective application of tax law should happen in the rarest of rare cases and for one of three reasons only: 

 To correct anomalies in the statute.
 To matters that are clarificatory in nature such as technical/procedural defects that vitiate the substantive law.
 To protect the tax base from abusive tax planning schemes to avoid tax. 

The panel has recommend deferring GAAR.

References 

Ministry of Finance (India)
Taxation in India
Income taxes